Spidia rufinota is a moth in the family Drepanidae. It was described by Watson in 1965. It is found in Cameroon and the Central African Republic.

References

Moths described in 1965
Drepaninae